Toon Boom Animation Inc. is a Canadian software company that specializes in animation production and storyboarding software. Founded in 1994 and based in Montreal, Quebec, Toon Boom develops animation and storyboarding software for film, television, web animation, games, mobile devices, training applications, and education. It was acquired by Corus Entertainment in 2012.

Toon Boom software is used in over 130 countries, and was awarded the Primetime Emmy Award in 2005 and 2012, among other awards.

History

In 1996, Toon Boom purchased the software development business of USAnimation studio. Its animation production services were to be merged into CST Entertainment according to a premature press release from CST. That merger never took place, and USAnimation's studio changed its name to VirtualMagic Animation in 1996 and operated independently. Toon Boom Animation continued the development of USAnimation software which became Toon Boom Opus. It has since become Toon Boom Harmony.

Founding President and Chief Executive Officer Jacques Bilodeau left the company in May 2003, and the company's board of directors appointed Chief Operating Officer Joan Vogelesang to take his place.

In 2006, Toon Boom acquired French company Pegs'n Co, developer of the 2D bitmap animation software called Pegs. Since the acquisition, the software has not been updated and can no longer be purchased.

In 2009, Toon Boom acquired the British company Cambridge Animation Systems, developer of Animo. Since the acquisition, the software has not been updated and can no longer be purchased.

In 2012, Toon Boom was acquired by Corus Entertainment.

Chief Executive Officer and President Joan Vogelesang stepped down in September 2014 after over 16 years at Toon Boom, and Paul Gardner was appointed as interim CEO.

On March 9, 2016, Toon Boom acquired all the related IP for the TACTIC Studio product, an asset management, production tracking and review tool from Toronto-based Southpaw Technology and planned to re-launch the product as Toon Boom Producer.

On June 13, 2017, Toon Boom re-branded and launched Producer.

Historical products
Toon Boom Opus (1996-2008) - formerly USAnimation, it was used in the traditional film/TV animation industry.
Tic Tac Toon (1996-2001) - succeeded by Toon Boom Studio.
Toon Boom Studio (2001-2015) - aimed at home users and individuals. Succeeded by Toon Boom Harmony Essentials.
Toon Boom Concerto (2004-2005)
Toon Boom Solo (2005-2007) - aimed at small studios. Succeeded by Toon Boom Digital Pro.
Toon Boom Digital Pro (2007-2009) - succeeded by Toon Boom Animate Pro.
Toon Boom Pencil Check Pro (2008-2014) - a line testing software product.
Toon Boom Animate (2008-2015) - aimed at professional animators, boutique studios, students, and educators. Succeeded by Toon Boom Harmony Advanced.
Toon Boom Manager (2009-2014) - a production tracking system for the entertainment industry.
Toon Boom Animate Pro (2009-2015) - aimed at animation studios and freelancers.
Flip Boom product line (discontinued in 2014) - entry-level animation software.
Garfield's Comic Boom (discontinued in 2014) - a comic strip or album creation software product developed with cartoonist Jim Davis. The application included built-in video tutorials by the cartoonist.

Products

Harmony
Harmony contains the tools required to handle cutout (puppet), paperless frame-by-frame and traditional animation workflows from scanning to compositing and 2D/3D integration. Its toolset includes pencil lines with textures, deformation tools, morphing, inverse kinematics, particles, built-in compositor, 3D camera and 2D-3D integration. Users can also draw animation directly into the software, using a graphics tablet.

Harmony has been in continuous development since 2005 and has been used on productions like Curious George, The Simpsons Movie, Disney's The Princess and the Frog and Winnie the Pooh, The SpongeBob Movie: Sponge Out of Water, My Little Pony: The Movie, Space Jam: A New Legacy, and The Bob's Burgers Movie among others. Harmony has also been used by content creators on YouTube.

Harmony Server
This software provides additional capabilities for teams of animators using Harmony who want to share files and manage assets from a central database that is located on a server. Its centralized database system allows the sharing of assets between scenes and enables the workload to be shared across a studio or between studios. It also includes production controls for managing rendering jobs and coordinating batch scanning of paper drawings. Harmony Server is available as an add-on for users of Harmony Advanced and Harmony Premium.

Storyboard Pro
This software is used in pre-production to create storyboards for a wide variety of project types including 2D and 3D animation, stop motion, and live action productions. Storyboard Pro contains all the tools required to create storyboards and animatics. Its toolset includes vector and bitmap drawing tools, pencils and textured brushes, a built-in camera, audio tools, a timeline for timing control, and a 3D toolset to integrate imported 3D models.

Producer
Producer is a web-based production tracking and digital asset management tool.

See also
USAnimation
Cambridge Animation Systems
List of 2D animation software
Adobe Animate
List of Flash animated television series
Animaker
Vyond

References

Software companies of Canada
Animation software
2D animation software
Companies based in Montreal
Entertainment companies established in 1994
Software companies established in 1994
Proprietary commercial software for Linux
Corus Entertainment subsidiaries
1994 establishments in Canada
Apple Design Awards recipients